Antrim is a rural community in the Northwestern part of the Halifax Regional Municipality in the Musquodoboit Valley on the Antrim Road off Route 212. 

According to the majority of residents, Antrim borders Carroll's Corner where the pavement on Antrim Road meets the gravel section. It was first settled by the Kerrs, McMichael and McMullin families who came from Antrim in Northern Ireland. The community's early name was New Antrim.

Antrim is home to the 69 hectare Antrim Demonstration Woodlot, a woodlot under the management of Nova Forest Alliance. It was developed in 1998 as part of Canada's Model Forest Program.

Antrim Farms Ltd. is a large dairy farming operation run by the Schuurmans family.

References

External links
Explore HRM

Communities in Halifax, Nova Scotia